Rudy Paige (born 2 August 1989) is a South African rugby union player for  in the French Top 14. His usual position is scrum-half.

Career

Youth level

Golden Lions
Paige was included in a senior squad for the first time when he was named in the 2010 Vodacom Cup squad.

Blue Bulls
In March 2018 the  announced they would be parting ways with Paige after being the left out of the teams Super Rugby squad for the 2018 season.

Cheetahs
The  signed a three-month contract with Paige where he would play for the remainder of the Cheetahs 2017-18 Pro14 season.

Clermont Auvergne
Paige joined French Top 14 side  in 2019.

Other
Paige was captain of the S.A. schools side in 2007 and took part in the 2009 IRB Junior World Championship for the South Africa U20 team.

Paige also made his national team debut in the second half of South Africa's 64-0 victory over the USA in the pool stages of the 2015 Rugby World Cup.

References

South African rugby union players
Bulls (rugby union) players
Blue Bulls players
Golden Lions players
Living people
1989 births
South Africa Under-20 international rugby union players
South Africa international rugby union players
Sunwolves players
Free State Cheetahs players
Cheetahs (rugby union) players
ASM Clermont Auvergne players
Rugby Club Vannes players
Rugby union scrum-halves
Rugby union players from the Western Cape